Fermin Muguruza (born 20 April 1963) is a Basque rock musician, singer, songwriter, producer, record label manager, and co-founder of the ska punk band Kortatu, active from 1983 to 1988, and of the crossover group Negu Gorriak, active from 1990 to 1996.

Musical career

Muguruza has taken part in more than twenty albums, and is one of the most important artists from the Basque Country.

In 1983 he founded a fusion ska punk band called Kortatu with his brother Iñigo and drummer Treku Armendariz, among the first to popularise ska in Spain. They were clearly influenced by The Clash, in fact, Muguruza decided to create the band after seeing Strummer's band in a gig in Donostia on May 2, 1981. His song "Sarri, Sarri", a Basque cover of Toots & the Maytals' "Chatty Chatty", grew into a highly popular song during the 80s, where he makes an explicit reference to Joseba Sarrionaindia's artful escape from prison in 1985.

In 1988 the group disbanded, but Fermin and Iñigo would come together again in 1990 to create the crossover group Negu Gorriak, along with Kaki Arkarazo, who had produced Kortatu's last records. In 1997 he collaborated with Dut.  More recently he has developed a solo career, always defending the use of the Basque language and the need for social justice.

Views on society and politics
In interviews he has persistently denounced the policies of the Basque, Spanish and French governments and police bodies as well as of Spanish nationalist groups. At an international level, Fermin Muguruza holds acute left-wing views that lead him to criticize the U.S. government, corporations and the globalization process, all of which he denounces as imperialistic and homogenizing.

In an interview with Freemuse, Muguruza speaks about his experience as a musician under the democracy of today.  He has performed in concerts where fascists would come to his concerts with bombs, threatening him and his Basque hip-hop music. However, he experiences censorship within Spain for his political and social messages, but still performs and makes music, saying "authorities are afraid of my music because it is a tool against ignorance. And these authorities want the ignorance so that they can do what they want".

Musically, he has been inspired by the, in his opinion, oppression of Spain over Basque Country. And although most of his lyrics are in Basque, his compositions are a melting pot of different cultures, with a big influence of Jamaican and electronic music (especially drum and bass), which he commonly mixes over Basque instruments.  In his track "Euskal Herria Jamaika Clash!, Fermin Muguruza mixes Jamaican rhythms with sounds from Basque traditional musical instruments to produce unique musical hybrids that feature Basque heritage and culture.

Discography

Kortatu
Kortatu/Cicatriz/Jotakie/Kontuz Hi! (1985)
Kortatu (1985)
El estado de las cosas (1986)
Kolpez kolpe (1988)
Azken guda dantza (1988)

Negu Gorriak
Negu Gorriak (1990)
Gure Jarrera (1991)
Gora Herria (1991)
Borreroak Baditu Milaka Aurpegi (1993)
Hipokrisiari Stop! Bilbo 93-X-30 (1994)
Ideia Zabaldu (1995)
Ustelkeria (1996)
Salam, agur (1996)
1990-2001 (DVD + Live CD) (2005)

Fermin Muguruza eta Dut
Ireki ateak (1997)

Fermin Muguruza
Amodio eta gorrotozko kantak (1984-1998) (1998)
Brigadistak Sound System (1999)
erREMIXak (1999)
FM 99.00 Dub Manifest (2000)
Korrika. mundu bat euskarara bildu (2001)
In-komunikazioa (2002)
Irun Meets Bristol. Komunikazioa (2003)
Sala Apolo, Barcelona 21/01/04 (2004)
99-04 DVD + CD (2005)
Xomorroak (Bizitza lorontzian) (2005)
Euskal Herria Jamaika Clash (2006)
BASS-que Culture DVD + Remix CD (2006)
Asthmatic Lion Sound Systema (2008)
Asthmatic Lion REMIX + beste harribitxi batzuk (2009)

References

External links

www.negugorriak.net

1963 births
Living people
Basque musicians
Basque-language singers
Spanish songwriters
Basque singers
Spanish rock singers
People from Irun
20th-century Spanish singers
21st-century Spanish musicians
21st-century Spanish singers
Rock en Español musicians
20th-century Spanish male singers
21st-century Spanish male singers